José Molíns Montes (17 February 1933 – 2 March 2023) was a Spanish long-distance runner. He competed in the men's 5000 metres at the 1960 Summer Olympics.

Molíns died on 2 March 2023, at the age of 90.

References

1933 births
2023 deaths
Athletes (track and field) at the 1960 Summer Olympics
Spanish male long-distance runners
Olympic athletes of Spain
Place of birth missing
20th-century Spanish people